Ruslan Borisovich Beslaneyev (born 18 June 1982) is a former Russian professional football player.

Club career
He played in the Russian Football National League for FC Rotor Volgograd in 2010.

References

External links
 

1982 births
People from Krasnodar Krai
Living people
Russian footballers
Association football defenders
FC Zhemchuzhina Sochi players
FC Olimpia Volgograd players
FC Rotor Volgograd players
FC Sakhalin Yuzhno-Sakhalinsk players
FC Sever Murmansk players
Sportspeople from Krasnodar Krai